Talwandi Sabo Power Project is a coal-based super-critical thermal power plant located in Banawala village in Mansa district in the Indian state of Punjab. The power plant is operated by Talwandi Sabo Power Limited (TSPL), a subsidiary of Vedanta. The Engineering, procurement and construction contract is given to SEPCO1 of People's Republic of China.

Capacity

References

Coal-fired power stations in Punjab, India
Mansa district, India
Vedanta Resources
Energy infrastructure completed in 2013
2013 establishments in Punjab, India